Charsadda District may refer to:

Charsadda District, Afghanistan
Charsadda District, Pakistan